Michael Milosevich (January 13, 1915 – February 3, 1966) was a shortstop in Major League Baseball player who played from 1944 to 1945 for the New York Yankees.

External links

1915 births
1966 deaths
Major League Baseball shortstops
New York Yankees players
Akron Yankees players
Americus Rebels players
Atlanta Crackers players
Binghamton Triplets players
Baxley-Hazlehurst Red Socks players
Joplin Miners players
Kansas City Blues players
Lumberton Auctioneers players
New Orleans Pelicans (baseball) players
Newark Bears (IL) players
Norfolk Tars players
Washington Generals players
Baseball players from Illinois
People from Zeigler, Illinois